The soprano trombone (sometimes called a slide trumpet, especially in jazz) is the soprano instrument in the trombone family of brass instruments. It is usually pitched in B an octave above the tenor trombone, and has a bore, bell and mouthpiece similar to the B trumpet. Although modern instruments are made, the soprano remains a rare trombone seldom written for, compared to the tenor, bass, or even the uncommon alto trombone.

History 

Whether the soprano trombone was ever widely used in history is still a matter for debate. The earliest surviving instrument was made in 1677, held by the Kremsegg musical instrument museum.

The soprano trombone was used in German-speaking countries to play the treble part in chorales, and this tradition survives in the trombone choirs of Moravian Church music. Outside of this, there is little evidence of the instrument being employed in musical ensembles or written works since the 18th century.

Soprano trombone is seldom mentioned in the major orchestration treatises of the 19th century; Marx (1847) and Prout (1897) considered the soprano obsolete, and Widor's 1904 text mentioned that some manufacturers were making them, while calling the alto obsolete.

During the 20th century some soprano trombones—dubbed slide cornets or later, slide trumpets—were made as novelties or for use by jazz players. These were used by a few jazz trumpet players like Louis Armstrong and Dizzy Gillespie, but otherwise have not been widely adopted.

Construction 

The B soprano trombone is built with dimensions similar to the trumpet. It usually takes a trumpet mouthpiece, although some instruments are made with a smaller shank to take a cornet mouthpiece.
The slide of a soprano trombone is much shorter than that of a standard tenor trombone, with the positions only half the distance apart. Some instruments are built with a shorter slide of six positions rather than seven expected on a fully chromatic instrument, in order to dedicate more of the tubing length to the bell section for improved sound characteristics.

Soprano trombones are made by several trombone manufacturers, often as inexpensive novelty instruments, although high quality professional instruments are made by Kanstul, Miraphone, Thein and others.

In the early 2010s, trumpeter Torbjörn Hultmark of the Royal College of Music commissioned the first soprano trombone with an F attachment, built by Thein Brass. Helmut Voigt also makes a soprano with an F valve.

Sopranino and piccolo trombones 

The sopranino and piccolo trombones have no historical repertoire, first appearing in the 1950s as novelty or "show" instruments. They are smaller and higher than the soprano; the sopranino a fourth higher in E, and the piccolo in B an octave above. These instruments use piccolo trumpet mouthpieces and are essentially piccolo trumpets, but with a slide instead of valves. The piccolo is offered by some instrument manufacturers, for example Thein and Wessex.

Performance, range and pedagogy 

The soprano trombone's similarity to the trumpet—its high pitch, mouthpiece size and narrow embouchure—means it is usually played by trumpeters. The player must combine both trumpet playing and trombone slide techniques to control intonation and note selection accuracy.

Soprano trombone parts are usually written in treble clef and, like the trumpet, can be in concert pitch or transposed in B.
The range of the B soprano trombone is similar to the B trumpet, E to C.

As part of his "Soprano Trombone Project", Torbjörn Hultmark has used the instrument to successfully begin children on brass instruments from as young as the age of four, and is the world's first registered Suzuki teacher in soprano trombone. Hultmark has also worked with the British Music Teachers Board to produce a syllabus of grade examinations for the soprano trombone. Other researchers have reported the soprano trombone can also be used as a pedagogical tool to help trumpet players improve several core aspects of their playing technique.

Repertoire 

There is very little classical repertoire written specifically for soprano trombone. The earliest pieces are three cantatas by Johann Sebastian Bach and two passions by Georg Philipp Telemann (as edited by his grandson) from the early 18th century, and a large body of Moravian Church music for trombone choir from the late 18th and 19th century.

In contemporary music, composers have very occasionally included soprano trombone in orchestral works. British composer Brian Ferneyhough called for two in his large 2006 work Plötzlichkeit; after playing one of the parts in a performance, Hultmark became a proponent of the soprano trombone as a serious instrument. He has written and commissioned new compositions for it, and promotes its use as a first instrument for children.

In jazz, some contemporary artists are employing the soprano trombone in their work. Wycliffe Gordon and Christian Scott both use the instrument in solos and on their albums. New York musician Steven Bernstein has become well known for playing the "slide trumpet" in his band, Sexmob.

References

Bibliography

External links 
 Torbjörn Hultmark: Soprano Trombone Project
 Moravian Music Foundation: The Moravian Trombone Choir

Trombones
B-flat instruments
Continuous pitch instruments